Charles Eriksson (12 December 1907 – 31 January 1964) was a Swedish sailor. He competed in the O-Jolle event at the 1936 Summer Olympics.

References

External links
 

1907 births
1964 deaths
Swedish male sailors (sport)
Olympic sailors of Sweden
Sailors at the 1936 Summer Olympics – O-Jolle
Sportspeople from Stockholm